Giuliana Olmos and Marcela Zacarías were the defending champions but Olmos chose not to participate. Zacarías partnered alongside Madison Brengle, but the pair withdrew ahead of their quarterfinal match against Abigail Rencheli and Alana Smith.

Maria Kozyreva and Ashley Lahey won the title, defeating Jaeda Daniel and Nell Miller in the final, 7–5, 6–2.

Seeds

Draw

Draw

References

External Links
Main Draw

Christus Health Pro Challenge - Doubles